Edwin Manie Clements (October 11, 1863 – March 7, 1920) was an American journalist and politician who served in the Virginia House of Delegates.

References

External links 

1863 births
1920 deaths
Democratic Party members of the Virginia House of Delegates
19th-century American politicians